Shootdown may refer to:

 List of aircraft shootdowns
 List of airliner shootdown incidents
 Shootdown (film), 1988 film
 Shoot Down, 2006 documentary